Greenfield Football Club is a football club representing the Flintshire village of Greenfield in Wales. They play their home games at The Old Courtaulds Pitch, located by the A548 road at Greenfield.They currently play in the North East Wales Football League Premier Division.

History
The club started life in the Clwyd Football League Division Two in the 2005–06 season, formed by Barry Ainsworth, who had previously run a youth section in the village in the 1990s. Ainsworth managed the club for six years after the club's formation, overseeing promotion as Clwyd Division One champions in 2007–08 with a perfect record of 24 straight wins and into the Welsh Alliance League in 2011–12. The club's next management team, Scott Beck and Tony Hogan, guided the club to the Welsh Alliance Division Two championship in 2015–16.

The club joined the newly formed North East Wales Football League in 2020 as a Premier Division club and after the first planned season was cancelled due to the Coronavirus pandemic, the club were inaugural champions in the 2021–22 season.

Honours

Leagues
North East Wales Football League Premier Division – Champions: 2021–22
Welsh Alliance League Division Two – Champions: 2015–16
Clwyd Football League Division One – Champions: 2007–08

Cups
North Wales Coast FA Intermediate Cup – Winners: 2008–09
Clwyd Football League Premier Division Cup – Winners: 2008–09
Halkyn Cup – Winners: 2005–06
REM Jones Cup – Winners: 2006–07

References

External links
Official site
Official FAW page

Welsh Alliance League clubs
Sport in Flintshire
Football clubs in Wales
Association football clubs established in 2005
2005 establishments in Wales
North East Wales Football League clubs
Clwyd Football League clubs